The Vu+ (pronounced VuPlus), is a series of Linux-powered DVB satellite, terrestrial digital television receivers (set-top box), produced by Korean multimedia brand Ceru Co., Ltd.

History and description 
All older Vu+ hardware set-top boxes are MIPS-powered, newer are all ARM-powered and uses Enigma2 image based software as firmware.

Its firmware is officially user-upgradable, since it is a Linux-based computer, as opposed to third-party "patching" of alternate receivers. Firmware is based on Enigma 2, which was originally designed for Dreambox by Dream Multimedia. All units support Conax conditional access (CA) system, with software-emulated conditional-access modules (CAMs) available for many alternate CA systems. The built-in Ethernet interface allows networked computers to access the recordings on the internal hard disks and stream live picture from the tuners. It also enables the receiver to store digital copies of DVB MPEG transport streams on networked filesystems or broadcast the streams as IPTV to VideoLAN and XBMC Media Center clients. Unlike many PC based PVR systems that use free-to-air type of DVB receiver cards, the built-in conditional access allows receiving and storing encrypted content.

In the beginning of September in 2011, Dream Multimedia obtained a temporary injunction against the Satco Europe GmbH company for using their "Enigma 2" name in an advertising flyer to promote the Linux operating system installed on the Vu+ set-top-boxes, as "Enigma"(2) is a registered trademark name of Dream Multimedia GmbH.

Models 

 Note that Vu+ Uno and Vu+ Ultimo have a dual core processor BCM7413.
 * in most cases Solo is underclocked to 220.67MHz
 *** in Solo SE standard 9-pin D-sub connector is changed to 6-pin RJ11

Triple tuner 
Vu+ Ultimo (3 x pluggable DVB-S2 or DVB-T,T2/C tuners)
Vu+ Ultimo 4K (2 x pluggable FBC DVB-S/S2 tuner or dual FBC DVB-C tuner and 1 x p&p DVB-S2 or DVB-T/C tuners)

Twin tuner 
Vu+ Duo 4K (2 x p&p slot for dual FBC DVB-S/S2X tuner, dual DVB-T2 tuner, dual FBC DVB-C tuner)
Vu+ Solo 4K (2 fixed DVB-S/S2 tuner and 1 x pluggable DVB-S2 or DVB-T/C tuners)
Vu+ Duo2 (2 x p&p DVB-S2 or DVB-T/C tuners)
Vu+ Solo2 (2 x fixed DVB-S/S2 tuners)
Vu+ Duo (2 x fixed DVB-S/S2 tuners)
Vu+ Uno Twin (1 p&p DVB-S2 Twin tuner)

Single Tuner 
Vu+ Solo (1 fixed DVB-S/S2 tuner)
Vu+ Solo SE (1 p&p DVB-S2 or DVB-T/C tuner)
Vu+ Solo SE v2 (1 p&p DVB-S2 or DVB-T/C tuner)
Vu+ Uno (1 p&p DVB-S2 or DVB-T/C tuner)
Vu+ Uno 4k (1 p&p DVB-S2 or DVB-T/C tuner)
Vu+ Uno 4k SE (1 fixed DVB-S/S2X tuner or DVB-T/T2/C tuner)
Vu+ Zero (1 fixed DVB-S/S2 tuner)
Vu+ Zero SE (1 fixed DVB-S/S2 tuner)
Vu+ Zero 4k (1 fixed DVB-S/S2X tuner or DVB-T/T2/C tuner)

XBMC4STB project by Vu+ 

In September 2011, at "Vu+ Day", in Amsterdam, it was publicly announced that the generation of Vu+ DVB satellite receivers to be released publicly in the end of 2012 would be ARM-powered and use XBMC Media Center (now renamed to Kodi Entertainment System) software for its main GUI, an OpenEmbedded-based development-project that they call "XBMC4STB" (XBMC for Set-Top-Boxes), with beta releases of both the software and new hardware said to be made available to XBMC developers before they will be released to the public.

However it took two more years before a native source port of XBMC was available on the newer Vu+ (VuPlus) based set-top box models SoloSe, Solo2, and Duo2, all of which are MIPS instead ARM based. XBMC will not be made available for older Vu+ set-top boxes due to hardware limitations with missing OpenGL graphics acceleration.

Open Black Hole
"Open Black Hole" is an open source project for making unofficial third-party OpenPLi based images for newer Vu+ set-top boxes. Using the XBMC4STB software fork of Kodi/XBMC from Vu+, the images are designed as a hybrid integration between Kodi/XBMC media center software and Dreambox's Enigma2 PVR software scripts, forked from OpenPLi (based on OpenEmbedded Linux operating system for embedded systems), it is as such also fully compatible with PLi plugins and coding infrastructure. The project was first announced on 25 May 2015 and is maintained by the Black Hole Team, a team of independent developers of long popular community driven firmware images for Vu+-based set top-boxes, however these Open Black Hole project images are completely separate from the original Black Hole image for Vu+.

See also

Dreambox
DBox2
Enigma (DVB)
Slingbox
Kodi Entertainment System (formerly XBMC Media Center) software
Video4Linux
Smart TV
Unibox

References

External links

Official 
 Vu+ home page

Image 
 Open/Black Hole image
 OpenPLi image
 VTI image
 VIX image
 OpenATV image
 Open Vision image

Satellite television
Set-top box
Television technology
Digital video recorders
Linux-based devices